St Rose's Senior High (Rosec or Roses) is a public Catholic high school for girls, located in Akwatia in the Eastern Region of Ghana. The second-cycle high school was founded in 1965 by the Dominican Sisters.

History 
St Rose's Senior High School is one of the girls' schools in the Eastern Region being managed by the Catholic Church. St. Rose's Senior High School (Formerly St. Roses Secondary School) was founded in November 1965 by the Dominican Sisters from Speyer, Germany. The Dominican founding Sisters were; Rev. Sr. Victricia Koch, who was then the Superior General of the Dominican Sisters in Ghana; Rev. Sr. Beatrix Koob, Rev. Sr. Zita Simon and Rev. Sr. Solamen Ott. They were brought to Ghana by the Most Reverend Bishop Joseph Oliver Bowers, the then Bishop of the Accra Diocese of the Catholic Church.

The school first started as a teacher training college with 80 students but in September 1969, the teacher training college was changed over into a secondary school with the initial enrollment of 72 students. Barima Kofi Bempong II, the then chief of Akwatia, the Akwatia Traditional Council and the Akwatia Town Development Committee passed a resolution that gave birth to the establishment of the school.

Alliance
The school has an ongoing alliance with its fellow Roman Catholic boys' school St. Peter's Boys Senior Secondary School (called Sperosa).

Competitions 
They have been competing in the Ghana National Science and Maths Quiz over the years.

Notable alumni
 Marietta Brew Appiah-Oppong, lawyer and politician
Eureka Emefa Adomako,  botanist, researcher and academic
 Abena Amoah, investment banker
 Francisca Oteng-Mensah, politician
Patricia Obo-Nai, Vodafone Ghana/CEO
 Nana Ama Dokua Asiamah Adjei, politician
 Nana Anima Wiafe-Akenten, media practitioner and academic
 Sandra "Alexandrina" Don-Arthur, International Makeup artist and beauty mogul
 Sandra Opoku, acting director of Ghana Ports
 Phyllis Osei, police officer

See also

 Education in Ghana
 List of senior high schools in Ghana
 Roman Catholicism in Ghana
 Women in Ghana

References

1965 establishments in Ghana
Dominican schools
Educational institutions established in 1965
Girls' schools in Ghana
High schools in Ghana
Catholic secondary schools in Ghana
Education in the Eastern Region (Ghana)